The 1980 NBL Finals was the postseason tournament of the National Basketball League's 1980 season, which began in February. The finals began on 14 June. The tournament concluded with the minor premiers St Kilda Saints defeating the second-seeded West Adelaide Bearcats in the NBL Grand Final on 15 June. Rocky Smith was named NBL Grand Final MVP.

Format
The NBL finals series in 1980 consisted of two semi-final games, and one championship-deciding grand final. The finals were contested between the top four teams of the regular season, with the finals weekend hosted at the neutral Dowling Street Stadium in Launceston, Tasmania.

Qualification

Ladder

Playoff bracket

Semi-finals

|- bgcolor="#CCCCFF" font size=1
!width=90| Date
!width=180| Home
!width=60| Score
!width=180| Away
!width=70| Box Score

Grand Final

|- bgcolor="#CCCCFF" font size=1
!width=90| Date
!width=180| Home
!width=60| Score
!width=180| Away
!width=70| Box Score

See also
 1980 NBL season

References

Finals
National Basketball League (Australia) Finals